MME (2,4-dimethoxy-5-ethoxyamphetamine) is a lesser-known psychedelic drug. It is a dimethoxy-ethoxy analog of TMA-2. MME was first synthesized by Alexander Shulgin from ethylvanillin. In his book PiHKAL, the minimum dosage is listed as 40 mg and above, and the duration listed as 6–10 hours. Shulgin gives MME a ++ on the Shulgin Rating Scale.

Pharmacology 
Shulgin describes in his book an experiment with MME, in which he admistered varying amounts of the drug to mice via injections. Shulgin reports that 7 of the 9 mice injected with MME died as a result. After describing his experiment, Shulgin speculates that MME may have an LD50 value of around 60–80 mg/Kg in mice when injected. Shulgin describes that one of the mice began convulsing after being administered MME: "[...] the mouse went into a twitching series of convulsions (known as clonic in the trade) and in five minutes he was dead." The convulsions Shulgin noted may have been a sympom of serotonin syndrome in the mouse due to MME's affinity towards serotonin transporter in Mus musculus.

MME's psychoactive effects may result from its affinity towards the 5-HT2A receptor. It is highly likely that MME is an agonist at the 5-HT2A receptor because the chemically similar TMA-2 is an agonist at this receptor. MME's also has lower affinities towards the 5-HT1B and dopamine D2 receptors as well as the dopamine and serotonin transporters, which may contribute towards MME's biological activity. Very little data exists about the pharmacological properties, metabolism, and toxicity of MME.

Chemistry 
MME has several isomers. MEM is one of them along with EMM. According to Alexander Shulgin EEM is not biologically active. MEM is biologically active in humans and also possesses an affinity for the 5-HT2A receptor.

Synthesis 

Shulgin describes the synthesis of MME in his book PiHKAL. Shulgin starts with 4-ethoxy-3-methoxybenzaldehyde. Shulgin labels the 4-ethoxy-3-methoxybenzaldehyde as ethylvanillin,  although ethylvanillin is in fact 3-ethoxy-4-hydroxybenzaldehyde. Ethylvanillin can be methylate to 4-ethoxy-3-methoxybenzladehyde. The 4-ethoxy-3-methoxybenzaldehyde is then subjected to a Bayer-Villiger oxidation with peracetic acid and acetic acid to yield 4-ethoxy-3-methoxyphenol. The 4-ethoxy-3-methoxyphenol is methylated to yield 2,4-dimethoxy-1-ethoxybenzene. The 2,4-dimethoxy-1-ethoxybenzene is subjected to Reimer-Tiemann formylated to 2,4-dimethoxy-5-ethoxybenzaldehyde. The 2,4-dimethoxy-5-ethoxybenzaldehyde by subjecting it to a Knoevenagel condensation with acetic acid, ammonium acetate and nitroethane, and reducing the resulting 1-(2,4-dimethoxy-5-ethoxyphenyl)-2-nitropropene to MME with lithium aluminium hydride under an inert atmosphere.

See also 
 Phenethylamine
 Psychedelics, dissociatives and deliriants

References 

Substituted amphetamines
Phenol ethers